Cambium Learning Group is an American technology company which creates computer software and hardware products serving students ranging from pre-kindergarten to adult. As of December 2018, it is owned by Veritas Capital, a New York-based private equity firm.

The company's business units are named Learning A-Z, Lexia Learning, Voyager Sopris, ExploreLearning, Cambium Assessment, Kurzweil Education, and VKidz:

Cambium acquired Voyager Sopris Learning (formerly Voyager Learning Company) in December 2009. Cambium Assessment (formerly AIR Assessment) was acquired in January 2020. Kurzweil Education (formerly Kurzweil Educational Systems) was bought in April 2005. VKidz was acquired in December 2018.

In September 2020, in an all-cash deal, Cambium bought Rosetta Stone with an equity valuation of approximately $792 million. The acquisition would broaden Cambium's immersive learning services for students, administrators and individuals.

References

External links 

Educational publishing companies of the United States
Software companies based in Texas
Assistive technology
Companies based in Dallas
Companies formerly listed on the Nasdaq
2018 mergers and acquisitions
Private equity portfolio companies
Software companies of the United States